Hunter is a town located in Greene County, New York, United States. The population was 2,732 at the time of the 2010 census. The town contains three  villages, one named Hunter on the west , another is Lanesville on the southern side of Hunter, and the third called Tannersville the largest and center of the town. The town is on the southern border of Greene County with Lanesville Village adjacent to Ulster County. The Hamlet of Haines Falls is on the east of the town.

History 

The town was formed on January 27, 1813 from the town of Windham, but was then called "Edwardsville". The name of "Hunter" was assumed in 1814, named after John Hunter. Afterwards, the town lost some territory to the town of Saugerties in 1814 and to Jewett in 1849.

The area became a popular tourism destination in the late 19th and early 20th centuries. It was served by the Ulster and Delaware Railroad, which brought tourists to resort towns throughout the Catskill Mountains.

Geography
]]
According to the United States Census Bureau, the town has a total area of 90.7 square miles (235.0 km2), of which 90.4 square miles (234.3 km2) is land and 0.3 square miles (0.7 km2, or 0.31%) is water.

The southern town line and part of the eastern town  boundary are the border of Ulster County. The town is in the Catskill Mountains and the Catskill Park. Many of the Catskill High Peaks, including Hunter Mountain, a 4040 foot mountain that is the highest in the county and the second-highest in the Catskills, are in the town.

Demographics

As of the census of 2000, there were 2,721 people, 1,074 households, and 644 families residing in the town. The population density was 30.1 people per square mile (11.6/km2). There were 2,840 housing units at an average density of 31.4 per square mile (12.1/km2). The racial makeup of the town was 96.95% White, 0.59% Black or African American, 0.11% Native American, 0.15% Asian, 0.04% Pacific Islander, 0.33% from other races, and 1.84% from two or more races. Hispanic or Latino of any race were 2.09% of the population.

There were 1,074 households, out of which 26.6% had children under the age of 18 living with them, 43.8% were married couples living together, 10.1% had a female householder with no husband present, and 40.0% were non-families. 34.2% of all households were made up of individuals, and 12.5% had someone living alone who was 65 years of age or older. The average household size was 2.25 and the average family size was 2.88.

In the town, the population was spread out, with 26.2% under the age of 18, 6.0% from 18 to 24, 23.8% from 25 to 44, 27.9% from 45 to 64, and 16.2% who were 65 years of age or older. The median age was 41 years. For every 100 females, there were 102.8 males. For every 100 females age 18 and over, there were 101.8 males.

The median income for a household in the town was $33,382, and the median income for a family was $42,200. Males had a median income of $35,532 versus $22,188 for females. The per capita income for the town was $18,496.  About 11.1% of families and 19.5% of the population were below the poverty line, including 24.0% of those under age 18 and 16.5% of those age 65 or over.

Communities and locations in the Town of Hunter 
Edgewood – A hamlet in the southern part of the town on Route 214.
Elka Park (12427) – A hamlet south of Tannersville.
Haines Falls (ZIP Code 12436) – A hamlet east of Tannersville and west of Palenville
Hunter (ZIP Code 12442) – Village in the western part of the town on Route 23A.
Kaaterskill Falls – A location east of Haines Falls.
Lanesville (12450) – A hamlet in the southern part of the town, South of Edgewood on Route 214.
Onteora Park – A private park north of Tannersville
Platte Clove (12427 – A hamlet in the eastern part of the town.
Tannersville (12485) – The village of Tannersville is east of Hunter village.
Twilight Park – A private park in Haines Falls.

Points of interest
 For over 40 years, the village of Hunter has been home to a summer camp going by the name of Camp Loyaltown. The camp specializes in caring for individuals with intellectual and other developmental disabilities, including autism, emotional and behavioral disorders, cerebral palsy and Down syndrome. Every year, more than 650 campers/guests come to Camp Loyaltown to enjoy the scenic locale and traditional summer camp activities. The camp attracts staff (counselors, admin personnel etc.) from all over the world, who become a major presence and contributor to the village's economy each summer.
 Hunter Mountain is the highest peak in the county and the second highest in the Catskills. The mountain is the site of the Hunter Mountain ski area which is open for skiing and tubing in the winter and biking, sightseeing, zip lining and hiking in the summer. The ski resort is the largest employer in the village, which is run by Vail Resorts in the heart of Hunter. The seasonal nature of the mountain regulates the economic activity of the town.

Notable people
Robert O. Tyler (1831–1874), U.S. Civil War General
John Francis Hylan (1868–1936), 96th Mayor of New York City

References

External links

 Town of Hunter official website
 Hunter Chamber of Commerce
 Village of Tannersville
 The Catskill Archive – history of the Catskill Mountains
 Hunter Public Library
 Mountain Top Library in Haines Falls

Catskills
Towns in Greene County, New York